A bookmaker, bookie, or turf accountant is an organization or a person that accepts and pays off bets on sporting and other events at agreed-upon odds.

History
The first bookmaker, Ogden, stood at Newmarket in 1795.

Range of events 
Bookmakers in many countries focus on accepting bets on professional sports, especially horse racing and association football or Indian Premier League cricket. However, a wider range of bets, including on political elections, awards ceremonies such as the Oscars, and novelty bets are accepted by bookmakers in some countries.

Operational procedures 

By "adjusting the odds" in their favour (paying out amounts using odds that are less than what they determined to be the true odds) or by having a point spread, bookmakers aim to guarantee a profit by achieving a 'balanced book', either by getting an equal number of bets for each possible outcome or (when they are offering odds) by getting the amounts wagered on each outcome to reflect the odds.  When a large bet comes in, a bookmaker may also try to lay off the risk by buying bets from other bookmakers. Bookmakers do not generally attempt to make money from the bets themselves but rather by acting as market makers and profiting from the event regardless of the outcome. Their working methods are similar to those of an actuary, who does a similar balancing of financial outcomes of events for the assurance and insurance industries.

United Kingdom gambling industry 

The first bookmaker in the United Kingdom is considered to be Harry Ogden, who opened a business in the 1790s, although similar activities had existed in other forms earlier in the eighteenth century.

Following the Gaming Act 1845, the only gambling allowed in the United Kingdom was at race tracks. The introduction of special excursion trains meant that all classes of society could attend the new racecourses opening across the country. Cash flowed to the bookmakers who employed bodyguards against protection gangs operating within the vast crowds. Illegal betting shops were fined, but some, like Bella Thomasson, ran betting businesses that the police appeared to turn a blind eye to.

In 1961, Harold Macmillan's Conservative government legalised betting shops, with tough measures enacted to ensure that bookmakers remained honest. A large industry has grown since. At one time, there were over 15,000 betting shops. Now, through consolidation, they have been reduced to between 9,100 and 9,200 in 2013. The group of the largest bookmakers in the country, known as the "Big Three", comprises William Hill, Ladbrokes, and Coral.

Improved TV coverage and the modernisation of the law have allowed betting in shops and casinos in most countries. In the UK, on-track bookies still mark up the odds on boards beside the racecourse and use tic-tac or mobile telephones to communicate the odds between their staff and to other bookies, but, with the modernisation of United Kingdom bookmaking laws, online and high street gambling are at an all-time high. A so-called super-casino had been planned for construction in Manchester, but the government announced that this plan had been scrapped on 26 February 2008.

Germany 
The law on betting on horse racing and lotteries was passed by the German legislature and came into force on 1 July 2012. Since then, a tax of 5% of the bet must be paid to the tax authorities for all sports betting (offline and online). This affects the entire sports betting market in Germany.

Canada 
The fundamental law governing gambling activities in Canada is the federal Criminal Code (the "Code"). Sections 201 to 206, including section 206, make all types of gambling, betting and lotteries illegal throughout Canada with very limited exceptions such as betting-mutuel on horse racing (provided for in section 204). While the federal Code is the applicable prohibitionist law, all regulations (and regulatory bodies) are provincial, with one exception - pari-mutuel betting on horse racing, which is regulated by the federal Canadian agency Pari-Mutuel. However, this law has many critics, as it is believed that the Canadian sports betting market can generate $25 billion a year.

United States  
The Supreme Court overturned the federal ban on online gambling in 2018. However, while online gambling and casinos are legal, each state has its own rules. In Pennsylvania and New Jersey, the legal bookmakers are DraftKings, FanDuel and Pointsbet. Mississippi, New Jersey, Delaware, Nevada and West Virginia are on the road to legalisation, but Nevada and New Jersey have already passed laws. And most analysts predict the trend towards legalisation of online gambling will continue in more and more US states.

Internet gambling 
With the increasing number of online betting exchanges, betting exchanges are now providing free bet offers in an attempt to lure customers away from the competition. These free bets are generally based on the size of the deposit made into the gambling account. For example, if a customer deposited £20, the betting exchange would deposit an additional £20 for the customer to use. Free bet rules vary depending on the betting exchange.

Some bookmakers have even taken to using betting exchanges as a way of laying off unfavourable bets and thus reducing their overall exposure. This has led to insecurity from some TABs in Australia, state-run betting agencies that attempted to deny Betfair an Australian licence by running unfavourable ads in the media regarding the company. When Tasmania granted Betfair a licence despite these efforts, the Western Australian state legislature passed a law that specifically criminalised using betting exchanges from within the state; however, the law was later ruled to be unconstitutional. As a result, internet gambling in Australia required a new legal framework. The Interactive Gambling Act 2001 regulates the online gambling market in Australia, together with all its amendments. The last amendment was introduced on 13 September 2017. This bill states that online casinos, online poker and live betting are illegal in Australia. The Australian Communication and Media Authority (ACMA) is the regulatory body responsible for all supervising online gambling activities. Online sports betting is legal, however.

Most televised sports in the United Kingdom and the rest of Europe are now sponsored wholly or partly by Internet and high street bookmakers, with sometimes several bookmakers and online casinos being displayed on players' shirts, advertising hoardings, stadium signs and competition event titles. Sponsors are especially highlighted in the football category since football fans present a significant percentage of the bookmakers' target group.

Many of the bookmakers are sponsoring some of the major football teams in the major European football leagues, although Werder Bremen are currently fighting the German courts for the freedom to continue featuring bookmaker Bwin on their shirts, as Germany and France take action against online gamers. For example, as of 1 January 2020, Germany bettors will not be able to bet more than €1,000 a month. The latest amendment of the ITG states that. New online sportsbook laws are expected shortly in Germany, as this law is only temporary: the expiration date is set to be on 20 June 2020.

The situation is not that strict in France, however. Online sports betting in France is divided into two sections: Autorité de Régulation des Jeux en Ligne (ARJEL) regulates online sports betting, while online horse betting is regulated by the law "Decree 2010-498 from 17 May 2010. International bookmakers are allowed to enter the French market, thanks to the Law No. 2010-476 from 12 May 2010.

With the recent banning of tobacco sponsorship and the significant commercial budgets available to the gaming industry, sponsorship by car manufacturers, alcoholic drinks, soft drinks and fast-food marketers is being rapidly replaced by sponsorship from gaming companies in the Far East and Europe.

The United Kingdom's Gambling Act 2005 introduced a new regulatory system for governing gambling in Great Britain. This system includes new provisions for regulating the advertising of gambling products. These provisions of the Act came into effect in September 2007. It is an offence to advertise in the UK, gambling that physically takes place in a non-European Economic Area (EEA) or, in the case of gambling by remote means, gambling that is not regulated by the gambling laws of an EEA state. The Gambling Commission is the body that makes sure all sites and operators follow the new restrictions. In addition to the Gambling Act of 2005, according to the new gambling bill, online gambling sites are only allowed to offer services within the United Kingdom, if they are registered at the UK Gambling Commission.

The situation is more confused in the United States, which has attempted to restrict operators of foreign gambling websites from accessing their domestic market. This resulted in 2007 in a ruling against the US government by the World Trade Organization. However, common online gambling laws in the United States still don't exist - it differs from state to state. All forms of online gambling are illegal within the states of Utah and Hawaii, while the states of Delaware, Pennsylvania and New Jersey took a different approach: almost all forms of online gambling are legal in these states. These are the only US states where online casino sites can be legally registered. It is important to mention that Native Americans have their own gambling legislation - the Indian Gaming Regulatory Act of 1988. However, they need their state's approval to be able to offer their services online.

See also

Bookies – a German film
Betting shop
 Fixed odds betting terminal
Fixed-odds gambling
Glossary of bets offered by UK bookmakers
 History of gambling in the United Kingdom
List of bookmakers
Match fixing
Organized crime
Mathematics of bookmaking
Numbers game
Off-track betting
Parlay
Point shaving
Problem gambling
SP bookmaking
Sports betting
Sportsbook
Vigorish

References 

 
Accountants
Gambling terminology
Organized crime activity
Organized crime